Wellington was an electoral district of the Legislative Assembly in the Australian state of Western Australia.

The district had three incarnations and was based in the south-west of the state.

Members

Election results

Wellington